Jeong Tae-wook (born 16 May 1997) is a South Korean football defender who plays for Jeonbuk Hyundai Motors and the South Korea national under-23 football team.

Career

Jeong started his career with Jeju United.

Club career statistics

Honours

International
South Korea U23
Asian Games: 2018
AFC U-23 Championship: 2020

References

External links 
 

1997 births
Living people
Association football defenders
South Korean footballers
Jeju United FC players
Daegu FC players
K League 1 players
South Korea under-20 international footballers
South Korea under-23 international footballers
Footballers at the 2018 Asian Games
Asian Games medalists in football
Asian Games gold medalists for South Korea
Medalists at the 2018 Asian Games
Footballers at the 2020 Summer Olympics
Olympic footballers of South Korea